

Superlatives 
In the 45th Kerala State Film Awards, 85 films were considered and Ayaal won the maximum number of awards (5) followed by Zachariayude Garbhinikal (4).

Winners 
Most Awards

See also 
 61st National Film Awards

References

External links 
 http://www.keralafilm.com/

Kerala State Film Awards
2014 Indian film awards